Kou may refer to 

Kou, Burkina Faso, a village in Burkina Faso
Kou, Laiwu (口镇), town in Laicheng District, Laiwu, Shandong, China
Kou language 
Kou (name) includes lists of people with the given name and surname
Kou (surname) (寇), Chinese surname
Kou Uraki, a character in the fictional Gundam universe 
Kou (Cordia subcordata), a tree species
Kou, a main character in Kishiryu Sentai Ryusoulger

Similar spelling
 Kō Station (disambiguation), a train station in Japan.
 Ko fight Kō (Kou), in the board game Go
 Kugyō, also called Kō (Kou)
 Gong (title) and Gong (surname), called Japanese Kō (Kou)
 Duke or Prince, called Japanese Kō (Kou)
 Kō, the Hawaiian word for Saccharum officinarum

See also 
 KO (disambiguation)
 KOH (disambiguation)
 Gong (disambiguation)